The International Link of Orthodox Christian Scouts (DESMOS, from Greek "Δεσμός", bond) is an autonomous, international body committed to promoting and supporting Orthodox Scout associations and to be a link between the Scout movement and Orthodox churches. 

It enjoys consultative status with the World Scout Committee and forms the World Scout Inter-religious Forum (WSIF) together with the Council of Protestants in Guiding and Scouting, International Catholic Conference of Scouting, International Union of Muslim Scouts, International Forum of Jewish Scouts, Won-Buddhism Scout and World Buddhist Scout Brotherhood.

Member organizations
 Egypt: Boys and Girls scouts started 1914 but physically worked by 2012 all over Egypt
 Kuwait: Boys scouts started 2003- whereas Girl's scouts started at 2018- all over Kuwait
 Armenia: Hayastani Azgayin Skautakan Sharjum Kazmakerputiun
 Bosnia and Herzegovina: Savez izviđača Bosne i Hercegovine (supports by Roman Catholics and Islam)
 Bulgaria: Organizatsia na Bulgarskite Skauty
 Cyprus: Cyprus Scouts Association
 Finland: Suomen Partiolaiset
 Greece: Scouts of Greece
 Israel: Israel Boy and Girl Scouts Federation: Christian Orthodox Scout Association 
 Jordan: Jordanian Association for Boy Scouts and Girl Guides: Jordanian Association for Boy Scouts and Girl Guides
 Lebanon: Lebanese Scouting Federation: National Orthodox Scout Association - Scout national orthodoxe
 Macedonia: Sojuz na Izvidnici na Makedonija
 Moldova: Organizaţia Naţională a Scouţilor din Moldova
 Palestinian Authority: Palestinian Scout Association: Palestinian Orthodox Scouts Association
 Poland: Polish Scouting and Guiding Association
 Romania: Cercetaşii României
 Russia: Russian Association of Scouts/Navigators
 Serbia: Savez Izviđača Srbije
 Uganda: The Uganda Scouts Association: Uganda Orthodox Scouts
 Ukraine: National Organization of Scouts of Ukraine
 United States: Boy Scouts of America: Eastern Orthodox Committee on Scouting

See also
 Religion in Scouting
 Georges El Ghorayeb

References

External links
 DESMOS Official Site

International Scouting organizations
Christianity and society